Saint Nonna of Nazianzus was the wife of Gregory of Nazianzus the Elder, and the mother of Gregory the Theologian, Caesarius, and Gorgonia. She lived in Cappadocia, a province of the Roman Empire in present-day central Turkey.

Life
After Nonna married, she converted her husband Gregory to Christianity.  He had been a member of the Hypsistarians, a Jewish-pagan sect that worshipped Hypsistos, the "Most High" God. She was the mother of three children, each of whom became saints, the most notable of which being Gregory of Nazianzus. She outlived her husband and two of her children, dying in 374.

Her son Gregory tells of an occasion in 351 when Nonna fell sick with a severe illness and appeared to be at the point of death. On his way to visit a friend, Gregory hurried instead to his mother who, in the meantime, had begun to recover. She had a vision in which Gregory had given her magical cakes marked with the sign of the cross, and blessed by him.

Gregory championed Nonna as a model of Christian motherhood. He wrote of her,

References

External links
The Sisterhood of Saint Nonna, an Orthodox organization for wives of clergy
A life of Saint Nonna
Santiebeati

300s births
370s deaths
Byzantine saints
Saints from Roman Anatolia
4th-century Romans
Late Ancient Christian female saints
4th-century Christian saints
Year of birth unknown
Byzantine female saints
4th-century Byzantine people
4th-century Byzantine women
4th-century Roman women
People from Aksaray Province